Győr (Hungarian: Győr vasútállomás) is the main railway station in Győr, Győr-Moson-Sopron County, Hungary. The station opened on 24 December 1855. The station is located on the main line between Vienna and Budapest (Line 1 Budapest–Hegyeshalom railway) and Line 8 Győr–Sopron railway, Line 10 Győr–Celldömölk railway and Line 11 Győr–Veszprém railway. The train services are operated by MÁV START.

Train services
The station is served by the following services:

RailJet services Zürich - Innsbruck - Salzburg - Linz - St Pölten - Vienna - Győr - Budapest
RailJet services Munich - Salzburg - Linz - St Pölten - Vienna - Győr - Budapest
RailJet services Frankfurt - Stuttgart - Munich - Salzburg - Linz - St Pölten - Vienna - Győr - Budapest
EuroCity services Vienna - Győr - Budapest - Kiskunmajsa - Novi Sad - Belgrade
EuroCity services Vienna - Győr - Budapest - Debrecen - Nyíregyháza
Intercity services Graz - Szentgotthárd - Szombathely - Győr - Budapest
Regional services  Bruck an der Leitha - Hegyeshalom - Győr
Regional services Szombathely - Celldömölk - Győr - Tatabánya - Budapest
Local services Győr - Tatabánya - Budapest
Local services Sopron - Csorna - Győr
Local services Győr - Pannonhalma - Veszprémvarsány - Zirc - Veszprém
Local services Rajka - Hegyeshalom - Győr

Bus services
Győr bus station is located outside the entrance of the station.

References

External links

Railway stations opened in 1855
Railway stations in Hungary
Ferenc Pfaff railway stations
Railway stations in Hungary opened in the 19th century